NGC 7003 is a spiral galaxy around 220 million light-years  from Earth in the constellation Delphinus. NGC 7003 has an estimated diameter of 80,800 light-years. The galaxy was discovered by German astronomer Heinrich Louis d'Arrest on August 26, 1864. There also has been at least one supernova observed in NGC 7003.

On May 12, 2011 a Type II supernova designated as SN 2011dk was discovered in NGC 7003.

See also 
 NGC 1300
 List of NGC objects (7001–7840)

References

External links 

Astronomical objects discovered in 1864
Spiral galaxies
11662
Delphinus (constellation)
7003
65887
sort=3-53-8